Buheng (also Romanized as Būheng; also known as Būhīng) is a village in Jazmurian Rural District, Jazmurian District, Rudbar-e Jonubi County, Kerman Province, Iran. At the 2006 census, its population was 1,642, in 329 families.

References 

Populated places in Rudbar-e Jonubi County